The Ethnographic Museum of Tripoli is a museum located in Tripoli, Libya.

References

See also 

 List of museums in Libya

Museums with year of establishment missing
Ethnographic museums in Africa
Museums in Tripoli, Libya